"Country Is" is a song written and recorded by American country music artist Tom T. Hall. It was released in September 1974 as the second and final single from the album of the same name, Country Is. The song was Hall's fifth number one on the country chart.  The single went to number one for a single week and spent a total of eleven weeks on the country chart.

Chart performance

References 

Tom T. Hall songs
1974 singles
Songs written by Tom T. Hall
Song recordings produced by Jerry Kennedy
1974 songs
Mercury Records singles